Juan Díaz Canales is a Spanish comics artist and an animated film director, known as the co-creator of Blacksad.

Biography
At an early age, Juan Díaz Canales became interested in comics and their creation, which progressed and broadened out to include animated films. At the age of 18, he entered a school for animation. In 1996 he founded, together with three other artists, a company called Tridente Animation. Through this, he has worked with European and American companies, providing plots and scripts for  comics and animation films, as well as directing animated television series and animation movies.

During this period he met Juanjo Guarnido, with whom Canales decided to create comics based around a private investigator, Blacksad. After contacting several editors, Guarnido and Canales finally signed on with French publisher Dargaud, and in November 2000, Quelque part entre les ombres (Somewhere within the Shadows) was published. It was a great success with both critics and the public, and was awarded the Prix de la Découverte at the Sierre International Comics Festival and the "Avenir" Prize at the Lys-lez-Lannoy Festival, in Switzerland and France respectively. In March 2003 the second album Arctic-Nation, was released. It was once again a great success, winning the Angoulême Audience Award and the Festival Prize for Artwork in 2004. The third instalment of the Blacksad series, Âme Rouge (Red Soul), was published in 2005. In 2006 it was awarded the Angoulême Prize for a Series.

In 2015, he and artist Rubén Pellejero were chosen by Patrizia Zanotti, in charge of the copyrights to Hugo Pratt's Corto Maltese series, to publish a new album.

Awards
2000: Prize for Best First Album at the Lys-lez-Lannoy festival 
2000: Prix spécial at the Rœulx (Belgium) festival 
2000: Prix Némo at the Maisons-Laffitte festival 
2000: Prix découverte at Sierre International Comics Festival 
2001: Best Artwork Award at Festival de Chambéry 
2002: Best Artwork Award at Grand Prix Albert Uderzo 
2003: Prix spécial du jury au Sierre International Comics Festival 
2004: Angoulême Audience Award, for Arctic-Nation
2004: Angoulême Best Artwork Award, for Arctic-Nation
2004: Virgin Prize for Best Album, for Arctic-Nation 
2006: Angoulême Best Series Award, for the Blacksad series 
2006: Bédéis Causa - Prix Maurice Petitdier for the best foreign comic at the Festival de la BD francophone de Québec for Blacksad

Bibliography
 Blacksad series (Dargaud)
 Somewhere Within the Shadows (2000)
 Arctic Nation (2003)
 Red Soul (2005)
 A Silent Hell (2010)
 Amarillo (2013)

 Les Patriciens, éd. Glénat, Paris
 The imagination to power, 2009
Sous le soleil de minuit, 2015. With artist Rubén Pellejero within the Corto Maltese series.

Notes

Sources

 Canales publications in Pilote BDoubliées 
Blacksadmania.com (French)
reyes y poetas (Spanish blog of Juan Díaz Canales)

Living people
People from Madrid
Spanish comics writers
Year of birth missing (living people)